Martin Benka (21 September 1888, in Kostolište – 28 June 1971, in Malacky) was a Slovak painter and illustrator. He is regarded as the founder of Modernist 20th century Slovak painting. He was given the title National Artist. He is buried in the National Cemetery in Martin.

Style

Benka's ornamental style, influenced by folk art, contrasted sharply with the functional and purist approach of the German Bauhaus and Soviet avantgarde movements of that time. A contemporary of the famous Czech generation of cubist artists, Benka lived in Prague for 30 years. Benka, along with Ľudovít Fulla, Mikuláš Galanda, and the Czech Jaroslav Vodrážka created Modernist Slovak typography. He was a prolific creator of different fonts – between 40 and 60 of them.

Inspirations
Whilst searching for characteristic features, forms and colours of Slovakia, Benka would visit regions where people lived simply, in communion with nature. Benka would often travel around the countryside, documenting rural life and nature in his works, many of which he did outdoors and spontaneously. In addition to this, Benka built himself a countryhouse,  where he lived from 1959 to 1971.  This is today The Martin Benka Museum as outlined in his will, in which he bequeathed his work to the state.

Paintings 
Rieka Orava (The Orava River)
Jeseň na Spiši (Fall in Spiš)
Dve ženy (Two women)
Na pole (Into the Field)
Drevári pod Ďumbierom (Woodcutters below Ďumbier Mountain)
Za umením (On the quest for art)
Po búrke (After the storm)

References

External links

Martin Benka Museum
Benka typography
Artworks by Martin Benka

1888 births
1971 deaths
People from Malacky District
Slovak painters
Modern painters
Burials at National Cemetery in Martin
Slovak illustrators